Emma Stansfield (born Emma Thompson on 7 January 1978 in Monmouth, Monmouthshire, Wales) is a Welsh actress.

Life
Born Emma Thompson, her parents Colin and Gill Thompson trained at the Central School of Speech and Drama, and run an amateur dramatics society in Monmouth, Wales. Brought up in Much Birch, England and wanting to act from aged three, aged 12 she took the lead role of Oliver Twist in Monmouth Comprehensive School's production of Oliver! At Hereford Sixth Form College she continued her acting career by taking on the role of Cherry Barnum in their production of "Barnum."

In the week after graduating herself from the Central School of Speech and Drama in London, she took the name Emma Stansfield under Equity rules (as actress Emma Thompson had already registered the name), and landed a role in the teenage play Sparkleshark. Stansfield guest starred in the television series Holby City and The Royal, and then made her West End Theatre debut in Andrew Lloyd Webber's production of Daisy Pulls It Off.

Although having extensive theatre credits, Stansfield is most well known for her role of Veronica 'Ronnie' Clayton in the soap opera, Coronation Street from 2005, leaving in 2006.

In 2007 she played prostitute Esther Davies in the BBC's adaptation of Fanny Hill, and in April 2008 she portrayed Elaine Yates, wife of Jess Yates and mother of Paula Yates, in the BBC "Curse of Comedy" series episode, Hughie Green, Most Sincerely.

In 2008 she starred as an English nurse called Louise in the Irish drama Whistleblower, documenting the exposure and disbarring of Michael Neary, screened in August. In 2010 she played Belinda in the BBC television pilot Reunited. She also guest starred in the fourth season of Showtime's show The Tudors as the Protestant martyr Anne Askew.

In 2011 she appeared in a small role in Series 5 of Skins. In 2013 she played Audrey Gulliver in Privates.

In 2020 Stansfield and Kate Dickie appeared in the music video for Sleaford Mods' previously unreleased song "Second".

TV work
 Coronation Street (2005–2006) as  Ronnie Clayton
 Fanny Hill (2007) as Esther Davies
 Hughie Green, Most Sincerely (2008) as Elaine Yates
 Tess of the D'Urbevilles (2008) as Mary
 Heartbeat (2008) as Kim
 The Bill (2009) as Rebecca Reed
 Midsomer Murders "Small Mercies" (2009) as Rebecca Rix
 Reunited (2010) as Belinda
 The Tudors (2010) as Anne Askew
 Accused (2010) as Michelle Fensom
 Skins (2011) as Pamela
 Best Laid Plans (2012) as Lisa
 Endeavour (2012) as Sharon Veelie
 Privates (2013) as Audrey Gulliver
 Father Brown (2014) as Violet Fernsley
 Jamie Johnson (2016–20) as Karen Johnson
 The Coroner (2016) as Ruby Hamilton, episode 2.9 "Pieces of Eight"
 EastEnders (2019) as Olivia
 The Salisbury Poisonings (2020) as Nurse Emma
 Doctors (2021) as Rosie Statham

References

External links 

1978 births
Living people
People from Monmouth, Wales
Alumni of the Royal Central School of Speech and Drama
Welsh television actresses
Welsh soap opera actresses